Alexander Yurevich Fomichev (Russian: Александр Юрьевич Фомичёв; born February 19, 1979) is a Russian professional ice hockey Goaltender who currently plays for Torpedo Nizhny Novgorod of the Kontinental Hockey League (KHL).

Awards 
1999 — WHL East First All-Star Team

References

External links

Living people
Torpedo Nizhny Novgorod players
1979 births
Zauralie Kurgan players
Edmonton Oilers draft picks
Russian ice hockey goaltenders